Bonham Strand (Chinese: 文咸街) is a combination of two streets in Sheung Wan, Hong Kong: Bonham Strand (文咸東街) and Bonham Strand West (文咸西街).

As the name suggests, it was a strand and close to shore in the past though currently far from the seafront after several reclamations over history. This street renders the early shore line after 1842.

The streets are named after Sir George Bonham, the third Governor of Hong Kong (1848–1854), who led the reconstruction effort of Sheung Wan after a fire destroyed part of it in 1851. This was the government's first large-scale reclamation and road construction project.

Bonham Strand
Bonham Strand (文咸東街) starts from Queen's Road Central near Cosco Tower, with several junctions with Jervois Street, Mercer Street, Hillier Street, Clevery Street, Morris Street and Wing Lok Street, then returning to another section of Queen's Road Central in Possession Point.

The street is comparatively low to the surrounding area and is easily flooded during heavy rains.

The street is sometimes mistakenly written as Bonham Strand East after its Chinese name. The directory board in MTR Sheung Wan station is an illustration of the mistake.

Bonham Strand West
Bonham Strand West (文咸西街) starts from Bonham Strand and ends in Des Voeux Road West.

Bonham Strand West:

See also
List of streets and roads in Hong Kong

References

External links

Google Maps of Bonham Strand
Google Maps of Bonham Strand West

Roads on Hong Kong Island
Sheung Wan